Cainia is a genus of fungi in the family Cainiaceae. The genus, widespread in temperate regions, contains three species that grow on grasses.

References

Xylariales